Anil Kumari Malhotra is an Indian homoeopathic physician and the principal of Nehru Homoeopathic Medical College and Hospital of Delhi University. She is an alumnus of the Shri Sai Nath Post Graduate Institute of Homeopathy from where secured MD in homoeopathy in 2006 and has been holding the position of the principal of Nehru Medical College since 1 August 2007. She is known to have published several medical papers, has conducted medical workshops, featuring her presentations and participated in many continuing medical education programs. The Government of India awarded her the fourth highest civilian honour of the Padma Shri, in 2016, for her contributions to medicine.

See also 
 List of University of Delhi people

References

External links 
 

Recipients of the Padma Shri in medicine
Indian medical academics
Indian medical writers
Indian medical administrators
Year of birth missing (living people)
Indian homeopaths
Academic staff of Delhi University
Living people
20th-century Indian medical doctors
Indian women medical doctors
Women academic administrators
21st-century Indian medical doctors
Medical doctors from Delhi
20th-century women physicians
21st-century women physicians